"Eradicate the Doubt" is a song by Biffy Clyro and the third single from their 2003 album, The Vertigo Of Bliss, and their seventh overall single. It reached number 98 on the UK Singles Chart.

Track listings
Songs and lyrics by Simon Neil. Music by Biffy Clyro.

CD (BBQ374CD)
 "Eradicate the Doubt" – 4:26
 "Convex, Concave (Live at The Mean Fiddler, London, England, 14 June 2003)" – 4:22
 "57 (Live at The Mean Fiddler, London, England, 14 June 2003)" – 3:21
 "Now the Action is On Fire! (Live at The Mean Fiddler, London, England, 14 June 2003)" – 6:23

DVD (BBQ374374DVD)
 "Eradicate the Doubt" (Video)
 "Justboy" (Video)
 Photo Gallery

7" (BBQ374)
 "Eradicate the Doubt (Live at The Mean Fiddler, London, England, 14 June 2003) " – 4:26
 "The Ideal Height (Live at The Mean Fiddler, London, England, 14 June 2003)" – m:ss
 "Justboy (Live at The Mean Fiddler, London, England, 14 June 2003)" – m:ss

Download 
 "Eradicate the Doubt (Live at The Mean Fiddler, London, England, 14 June 2003) " – 4:26
 "The Ideal Height (Live at The Mean Fiddler, London, England, 14 June 2003)" – 3:22

Personnel
 Simon Neil – guitar, vocals
 James Johnston – bass, vocals
 Ben Johnston – drums, vocals
 Chris Sheldon – producer

Charts

References

External links
"Eradicate the Doubt" Lyrics
"Eradicate the Doubt" Guitar Tablature

2003 singles
Biffy Clyro songs
Songs written by Simon Neil
Song recordings produced by Chris Sheldon
2003 songs
Beggars Banquet Records singles